A Gavel is a small mallet used to conduct meetings

Gavel may also refer to:

 Anton Gavel (born October 24, 1984), a basketball player
 SS Empire Gavel, British name for a German merchantship captured by Britain in WWII and then given to Greece
 Erica Gavel (born May 25, 1991), a Canadian wheelchair basketball player 
 Gavel (sculpture) a 2008 sculpture by Andrew F. Scott 
 Gavel Fell a hill in England's Lake District

See also
 gravel
 Silver Gavel Award an award of the American Bar Association